Alessandro Riggi (born November 30, 1993) is a Canadian professional soccer player who plays as a forward.

Early career
At age 14, Riggi joined the Vancouver Whitecaps FC Academy. A year later, after the Montreal Impact started their own youth program, he decided to join their program, as it was his hometown team.

Riggi played with the Montreal Impact Academy in the Canadian Soccer League from 2010 to 2011. He was top scorer and team MVP in his two seasons, but was unable to secure a first-team deal.

Club career

Europe
After being unable to secure a first-team deal with Montreal, he went to Europe at age 19.  He went on trial with Sampdoria in Italy, before joining the Celta Vigo academy. In January 2013, he signed in Portugal with Atletico Reguengos and in Romania with CFR Cluj. Afterwards, he joined Trento Calcio in Italy.

FC Montreal
On March 13, 2015, it was announced that Riggi would join FC Montreal, a USL affiliate club of the Montreal Impact for their inaugural season.  He made his professional debut for the club on March 28 in a 2–0 defeat to Toronto FC II.

Phoenix Rising
On February 10, 2017, Riggi signed for USL club Phoenix Rising FC. Upon completion of the 2017 season, Riggi would re-sign with the club for the 2018 season. His time in Phoenix was marred by injuries, including a torn ACL that resulted in him being unable to play at all in 2019.

HFX Wanderers
Riggi signed for HFX Wanderers FC of the Canadian Premier League on December 18, 2019. He made his debut on August 15 against Pacific FC. He played two seasons for the Wanderers. In the shortened 2020 season, he helped the team advance to the final, though they lost to defending champions Forge FC. In the 2021 season, Riggi struggled with injuries, appearing in 17 match but never going the full 90 minutes. At the end of the season, he announced that he was leaving the club, though he enjoyed his time in Halifax.

Valour FC
On February 9, 2022, Riggi signed with Valour FC. He departed the club at the end of the season.

Career statistics

Honours
HFX Wanderers
 Canadian Premier League
Runners-up: 2020

References

External links

Fora de Jogo

1993 births
Living people
Association football midfielders
Canadian soccer players
Soccer players from Montreal
Canadian people of Italian descent
Canadian expatriate soccer players
Expatriate footballers in Italy
Canadian expatriate sportspeople in Italy
Expatriate footballers in Portugal
Canadian expatriate sportspeople in Portugal
Expatriate footballers in Spain
Canadian expatriate sportspeople in Spain
U.C. Sampdoria players
Celta de Vigo B players
Atlético S.C. players
FC Montreal players
Montreal Impact U23 players
Phoenix Rising FC players
HFX Wanderers FC players
Valour FC players
Canadian Soccer League (1998–present) players
Segunda División B players
Segunda Divisão players
Eccellenza players
USL Championship players
Canadian Premier League players
Canada men's youth international soccer players